The largespine velvet dogfish (Scymnodon macracanthus) is a shark of the family Somniosidae, found on the lower continental slopes between latitudes 50°S and 54°S in the southeast Pacific Ocean from the Straits of Magellan, and the southwest Pacific from New Zealand, at depths of between 650 and 920 m.  Its length is up to 68 cm.

Conservation status 
The New Zealand Department of Conservation has classified the largespine velvet dogfish as "Not Threatened" with the qualifier "Uncertain whether Threatened Overseas" under the New Zealand Threat Classification System.

References

Scymnodon
Fish described in 1906